The military history of Cuba begins with the island's conquest by the Spanish and its battles afterward to gain its independence. After the Communist takeover by Fidel Castro in 1959, Cuba became involved in many major conflicts of the Cold War in Africa and the Middle East, where it supported Marxist governments and fought against Western proxies. Castro's Cuba had some 39,000–40,000 military personnel abroad by the late 1970s, with the bulk of the forces in Sub-Saharan Africa but with some 1,365 stationed in the Middle East and North Africa. Cuban forces in Africa were mainly black and mulatto (mixed-race Spanish/African).

The loss of East European subsidies at the end of the Cold War weakened the Cuban Revolutionary Armed Forces.

Colonial period (1511–1902)

American Revolutionary War
During the American Revolutionary War (1775–83), Cuban soldiers, shoulder to shoulder with Mexicans, Spaniards, Puerto Ricans, and Dominicans fought under General Gálvez' command as far north as present-day Michigan.

Ten Years' War

The Ten Years' War (1868–78) was the first of three wars that Cuba fought against Spain for its independence. The Ten Years' War began when Carlos Manuel de Céspedes and his followers of patriots from his sugar mill La Demajagua began an uprising. Dominican exiles, including Máximo Gómez, Luis Marcano and Modesto Díaz, joined the new Revolutionary Army and provided its initial training and leadership. With reinforcements and guidance from the Dominicans, the Cuban rebels defeated Spanish detachments, cut railway lines, and gained dominance over vast sections of the eastern portion of the island. On 19 February 1874, Gómez and 700 other rebels marched westward from their eastern base and defeated 2,000 Spanish troops at El Naranjo. The Spaniards lost 100 killed and 200 wounded and the rebels a total of 150 killed and wounded. The most significant rebel victory came at the Battle of Las Guasimas, 16–20 March 1874, when 2,050 rebels, led by Antonio Maceo and Gómez, defeated 5,000 Spanish troops with 6 cannons. The five-day battle cost the Spanish 1,037 casualties and the rebels 174 casualties.

The Spanish built a fortified line (La Trocha) to prevent Gómez to move westward from Oriente province; it consisted of numerous small forts, wire fences and a parallel railroad line. It was the largest Spanish fortification in the New World. Gómez began an invasion of Western Cuba in 1875; he burned 83 plantations around Sancti Spíritus within a six-week period and freed their slaves. However, the vast majority of slaves and wealthy sugar producers in the region did not join the revolt. After his most trusted general, the American Henry Reeve, was killed in 1876, the invasion was over. The war ended with the signing of the Pact of Zanjón. The Spanish lost 27,000 troops in battle and another 54,000 dead from disease. The rebels sustained 40,000 dead and the island sustained over $300 million in property damage.

Cuban War of Independence
The Cuban War of Independence (1895–98) was the last major uprising by Cuban Nationalists against the Spanish Colonial Government. The conflict culminated with American intervention during the Spanish–American War.

Spanish–American War

The Spanish–American War (1898) was a major war fought by the United States and the Kingdom of Spain in the Spanish territories of Cuba, Puerto Rico, and the Philippines. The war was triggered with the sinking of the USS Maine in Havana Harbor. Cuban rebels fought alongside American troops throughout the war on the Cuban island. The war lasted for 10 weeks.

From 22–24 June, the U.S. V Corps under General William R. Shafter landed at Daiquirí and Siboney, east of Santiago, and established an American base of operations. A contingent of Spanish troops, having fought a skirmish with the Americans near Siboney on 23 June, had retired to their lightly entrenched positions at Las Guasimas. An advance guard of U.S. forces under former Confederate General Joseph Wheeler ignored Cuban scouting parties and orders to proceed with caution. They caught up with and engaged the Spanish rearguard of 1,500 soldiers led by General Antero Rubín who effectively ambushed them, in the Battle of Las Guasimas on 24 June. The Americans lost 16 killed and 52 wounded. The Spanish lost 12 dead and 24 wounded. On 1 July, a force of 15,065 American troops in regular infantry and cavalry regiments attacked 1,320 entrenched Spaniards in dangerous Civil War-style frontal assaults at the Battle of El Caney and Battle of San Juan Hill outside of Santiago, which cost the Americans 225 killed in action, 1,384 wounded in action, and 72 missing in action. At all battle sites on 1 July, the Spanish lost 215 killed, 376 wounded, and 200 captured.

After the battles of San Juan Hill and El Caney, the American advance halted. Spanish troops successfully defended Fort Canosa, allowing them to stabilize their line and bar the entry to Santiago. The Americans and Cubans forcibly began a siege of the city. During the nights, Cuban troops dug successive series of "trenches" (raised parapets), toward the Spanish positions. Once completed, these parapets were occupied by U.S. soldiers and a new set of excavations went forward. The Spanish forces surrendered on 17 July. In the Treaty of Paris (1898), Spain renounced its sovereignty over Cuba without naming a receiving country. Cuba then established its own civil government, which was recognized by the United States as the legal government of Cuba upon the announcement of the termination of United States Military Government (USMG) jurisdiction over the island on May 20, 1902. This date is celebrated as Independence day for the Republic of Cuba.

Early republic (1902–1959)

Spanish Civil War
Approximately 1,000 Cubans fought in Spain in the 1936–39 Spanish Civil War (nearly all of them in the Communist ranks of the International Brigades).

World War II
Cuba entered World War II in December 1941. The Cuban Navy performed convoy escort duties and antisubmarine patrols during the Battle of the Caribbean; despite its small size, the Cuban Navy quickly developed a reputation for being extremely efficient. Six Cuban merchant vessels were sunk by German submarines in the conflict and 79 Cuban sailors were killed.

1952 coup
Military strongman Fulgencio Batista staged a coup on 10 March 1952, removing Carlos Prío Socarrás from power. Cubans in general were stunned, but they were reluctant to fight. Batista created a consultative council from pliable political personalities of all parties who appointed him President months before elections were to be held in 1952. Batista’s past democratic and pro-labor tendencies and the fear of another episode of bloody violence gained him tenuous support from the bankers, and the leader of the major labor confederation.

The Cuban Revolution

The Cuban Revolution started as an uprising that resulted in the overthrow of the Fulgencio Batista government on 1 January 1959 by Fidel Castro and other revolutionary elements in the country. The Revolution began on 26 July 1953, when a group of armed guerrillas attacked the Moncada Barracks. From 1956 through the middle of 1958, Castro and his forces staged successful attacks on Batista garrisons in the Sierra Maestra mountains. Che Guevara and Raúl Castro helped to consolidate rebel political control in the mountains through guerrilla fighting, building trust with campesinos, and severely punishing traitors and informers. The irregular and poorly armed rebels harassed the Batista forces in the forests and mountains of Oriente Province.

Batista's troops were defeated by Castro's fighters at the Battle of La Plata (11–21 July 1958). Although Batista's army gained a victory at the Battle of Las Mercedes (29 July–8 August 1958), the army commander Eulogio Cantillo allowed the rebels to escape back into the Sierra Maestra mountains. As the rebels emerged from the Sierra Maestra into more populated areas, they seized significant amounts of Dominican-made Cristóbal Carbines and hand grenades; these became the rebels' standard weapons. The final blow to Batista's government came during the Battle of Yaguajay (19–30 December 1958). After suffering a crucial defeat at the Battle of Santa Clara, Batista fled the country and Castro came into power.

Post-revolution Cuba (1959–present)

Dominican Republic invasion attempt 

Cuban military intervention abroad began on 14 June 1959 with an attempted invasion of the Dominican Republic by a mixed group of Cuban soldiers and Cuban-trained Dominican irregulars. The expeditionary force was massacred just hours after having disembarked.

Castro feared a possible attack from the Dominican Republic and was determined to acquire jet aircraft as a preventive measure: Cuba's ability to repel an air attack was very precarious, since the Dominicans possessed 40 jet aircraft whereas Cuba had only one. The Dominican Air Force had the theoretical ability to reach and bomb Havana within 3 hours.

Escambray rebellion
Militant anti-Castro groups, funded by exiles, by the Central Intelligence Agency (CIA) and by Rafael Trujillo's Dominican government, carried out armed attacks and set up guerrilla bases in the Escambray Mountains. This led to a failed rebellion, which lasted longer and involved more soldiers than the Cuban Revolution. Near 1,000 families were forcibly uprooted from the Escambray countryside, leaving the rebels without their habitat to support them; the uprooted men were sent to prisons or executed after trial.

Bay of Pigs Invasion

The Bay of Pigs Invasion (known as La Batalla de Girón in Cuba), was an unsuccessful attempt by a U.S.-trained force of Cuban exiles to invade southern Cuba with support from U.S. armed forces to overthrow the Cuban government of Fidel Castro. The plan was launched in April 1961, less than three months after John F. Kennedy assumed the presidency in the United States. The Cuban armed forces, trained and equipped by Eastern Bloc nations, defeated the exile combatants in three days. Bad Cuban-American relations were exacerbated the following year by the Cuban Missile Crisis.

Cuban Missile Crisis

The Cuban Missile Crisis (October Crisis in Cuba) was a confrontation between the United States and the Soviet Union over nuclear missiles that were deployed in Cuba and Turkey. The Russian missiles were placed both to protect Cuba from further attacks by the United States after the failed Bay of Pigs Invasion, and in response to the U.S. deploying Thor missiles with nuclear warheads on the Soviet border in Turkey.

The situation reached the crisis point when U.S. reconnaissance imagery revealed Soviet nuclear missile installations on the island, and ended fourteen days later when the Americans and Soviets each agreed to dismantle their installations, and the Americans agreed not to invade Cuba.

Congo Crisis
The Congo Crisis was a period of turmoil in the Congo that began with national independence from Belgium and ended with the seizing of power by Joseph Mobutu. During the Congo Crisis, a Cuban expedition led by Che Guevara trained the Simba rebels to fight against the weak central government of Joseph Kasa-Vubu and the forces of Mobutu Sese Seko. This would be Cuba's first military action in Africa. The rebellion failed, leading the Cuban mission to withdraw.

Sand War
In 1963, Cuba assisted Algeria in the Sand War against Morocco. Cuba sent 300–400 tank troops and some 40 Russian-built T-34 tanks, which engaged in combat.

Guinea-Bissau War of Independence
Some 40–50 Cubans fought against Portugal in Guinea-Bissau each year from 1966 until independence in 1974; several Cubans were killed in the field by Portuguese troops.

Bolivia Insurgency

During the 1960s, the National Liberation Army began a Communist insurgency in Bolivia. The National Liberation Army was established and funded by Cuba and led by Che Guevara.

The National Liberation Army was defeated and Che Guevara was captured by the Bolivia government aided by the U.S. Central Intelligence Agency. Bolivian Special Forces were informed of the location of Guevara's guerrilla encampment. On 8 October 1967, the encampment was encircled, and Guevara was captured and later executed by Bolivian forces.

Eritrean War

Cubans trained Eritreans but later, in a political reversal, trained Ethiopian Marxist forces who were fighting against Eritreans.

War of Attrition
Cuba deployed 2,000 troops to support the Syrian forces fighting against Israel during the War of Attrition (November 1973–May 1974) that followed the Yom Kippur War (October 1973). Cuban tank units engaged in artillery duels with the Israelis in the Golan Heights. Precise Cuban casualty numbers are unknown.

Cuban intervention in Angola

Between 1975 and 1991, the Cuban military provided support for the left wing MPLA movement in a series of civil wars. During these conflicts the MPLA emerged victorious due in part to the substantial aid received from Cuba.

The Angolan War of Independence was a struggle for control of Angola between guerilla movements and Portuguese colonial authority. Cuba supplied the People's Movement for the Liberation of Angola (MPLA) rebels with weapons and soldiers to fight. The Cuban military would fight alongside the MPLA in major battles.

The Angolan Civil War was a 27-year civil war that devastated Angola following the end of Portuguese colonial rule in 1974. The conflict was fought by the MPLA against UNITA and the National Liberation Front of Angola (FNLA). MPLA was aided by Cuba and the Soviet Union, and UNITA and FNLA were supported by South Africa, United States and Zaire. It became Africa's longest running conflict. Cuban forces were instrumental in the defeat of South African and Zairian troops. Cuban forces also defeated the FNLA and UNITA armies in conventional warfare and established MPLA control over most of Angola.

In 1987–88, South Africa again sent military forces to Angola, and several inconclusive battles were fought between Cuban and apartheid forces. Cuba, Angola and South Africa signed the Tripartite Accord on 22 December 1988, in which Cuba agreed to withdraw troops from Angola in exchange for South Africa withdrawing soldiers from Angola and South West Africa. Cuba suffered up to 18,000 casualties (2,000-3,000 dead and 15,000 wounded) during the Angolan intervention. Regular South African forces may have suffered only 1,000 dead, excluding losses among paramilitary units and other irregular formations.

Angola paid a huge cost for the conflict: 800,000 dead, 4 million displaced, a rural infrastructure and economy virtually destroyed, the majority of the population impoverished, almost two million facing a famine, and human rights abuses becoming the norm. Hundreds of thousands of anti-personnel mines were laid across the country and are still in place, causing thousands of deaths and mutilating 70,000 people.

Ogaden War
The Ogaden War was a conflict between Somalia and Ethiopia between 1977 and 1978. Fighting erupted in the Ogaden region as Somalia attempted to annex it. When the Soviet Union began to support the Ethiopian Derg government instead of the Somali government, other Communist nations followed. In late 1977, the Cuban military deployed 16,000 combat troops along with aircraft to support the Derg government and the USSR military advisors in the region.

By March 1978, following months of tank warfare, a combined force of Ethiopian and Cuban troops (led by Russian and Cuban officers) repulsed the enemy. The Somali army, which had taken a severe beating from Cuban artillery and air attacks, was destroyed as a fighting force. Cuban losses were 160 killed, 11 tanks and 3 planes.

Invasion of Grenada

A 748-person count of Cuban workers (all but 43 of whom were construction workers) was present in Grenada at the time of the invasion of Grenada by the U.S. in 1983. Cuba was involved in the construction of a civil airport in Saint John, Grenada. Cuban losses during the conflict were 24 killed (only 2 of whom were professional soldiers), 59 wounded, and 606 made prisoners (later repatriated to Cuba). In 2008, the Government of Grenada announced the construction of a monument to honor the Cubans killed during the invasion by Genelle Figuroa. At the time of the announcement the Cuban and Grenadian government are still seeking to locate a suitable site for the monument.

Salvadoran Civil War
The Salvadoran Civil War was fought by the El Salvador government waging a vicious crackdown against various left-wing rebels, as well as committing war crimes against civilians, one example of which being the El Mozote massacre. Cuba supplied the rebels with weapons and advisors.

Nicaraguan Civil War
During the Sandinista revolution and the following Civil War, Cuba gave aid and support to the Sandinista government of Daniel Ortega. The Sandinista government was fighting the American backed rebels (aka) Contras. The conflict ended with the 1990 presidential election where Ortega lost to Violeta Barrios de Chamorro.

See also
 Cuban military internationalism

References

External links
 Cuba: Havana's Military Machine